Kiar-e Gharbi Rural District is in the Central District of Kiar County, Chaharmahal and Bakhtiari province, Iran. At the census of 2006, its population was 15,352 in 3,898 households, when it was in Shahrekord County, and before the establishment of Kiar County. There were 9,814 inhabitants in 2,979 households at the following census of 2011, by which time Kiar County had been formed. At the most recent census of 2016, the population of the rural district was 9,011 in 2,893 households. The largest of its 12 villages was Kharaji, with 2,880 people.

References 

Kiar County

Rural Districts of Chaharmahal and Bakhtiari Province

Populated places in Chaharmahal and Bakhtiari Province

Populated places in Kiar County